Saccharopolyspora hirsuta is a nocardioform actinomycete.

References

Further reading

Bycroft, Barrie W., ed. Dictionary of Antibiotics & Related Substances. CRC Press, 1987.
Embley, T. M., et al. "Fatty acid composition in the classification of Saccharopolyspora hirsuta." FEMS Microbiology Letters 41.2 (1987): 131–135.

External links

LPSN
Type strain of Saccharopolyspora hirsuta at BacDive -  the Bacterial Diversity Metadatabase

Pseudonocardineae